Penggung Airport or Cakrabuwana Airport (Indonesian: Bandar Udara Penggung) is a small airport located on Penggung, Cirebon City, West Java, Indonesia.

References 

Airports in West Java